Samarinovac may refer to:

 Samarinovac (Žitorađa), a village in Serbia
 Samarinovac (Negotin), a village in Serbia